Alison Stine is an American poet and author whose first novel Road Out of Winter won the 2021 Philip K. Dick Award. Her poetry and nonfiction has been published in a number of newspapers and magazines including The New York Times, The Washington Post, Paris Review, and Tin House.

Life

Stine was born in rural Indiana and raised in Mansfield, Ohio, but spent most of her adult life in Appalachia in southern Ohio, a setting which she says heavily influences her writings and her life. Stine has been partially deaf since birth. She now lives in Colorado.

Stine worked as an academic for a number of years, previously serving as the Emerging Writer Lecturer at Gettysburg College, and has taught at Fordham University, Grand Valley State University, Denison University, and Ohio University. She is also a former child actor and her plays have been performed at the Cleveland Playhouse, the International Thespian Festival, and Off-Broadway for Stephen Sondheim's Young Playwrights Inc. Urban Retreat.

Writings
Stine regularly writes for The New York Times, The Washington Post, The Atlantic, The Guardian, and other publications. Her poetry has been published in a number of literary journals including AGNI Online, Poetry, and Prairie Schooner, while her nonfiction has appeared in Phoebe, Santa Clara Review, Sycamore Review, and Virginia Quarterly Review. Her short fiction has been published in journals and magazines including Antioch Review, Paris Review, SmokeLong Quarterly, Swink, and Tin House.

Her essay "On Poverty," a commentary on classism in the writing world published in 2016 in the Kenyon Review, went viral.

Her first novel, Road Out of Winter, focuses on working-class women in rural Ohio dealing with climate change in a post-apocalyptic landscape in what Library Journal says "blends a rural thriller and speculative realism into what could be called dystopian noir." The novel won the 2020 Philip K. Dick Award.

Education
 PhD, Ohio University
 M.F.A, Poetry, University of Maryland
 B.A., English, Denison University

Bibliography

Novels and fiction 
 
 
  Winner of the Philip K. Dick Award 2021.

Collections of poetry 

 
 
  Winner of the 2010 Brittingham Prize in Poetry.

Anthologies
 “Waste.” (poem) Satellite Convulsions: Poems from Tin House. Eds. Brenda Shaughnessy, CJ Evans. Portland: Tin House Books, 2008. 
 “Ring of Fire” (essay) Literary Cash: Writings Inspired by the Legendary Johnny Cash. Ed. Bob Batchelor.  Dallas: Benbella Books, 2007. 
 “Stranger,” “Passage” (poems) Shooting the Rat.  Eds. Mark Pawlak, Dick Lourie, Ron Schreiber, Robert Hershon.  New York: Hanging Loose Press, 2003. 
 “Wind” (poem) Luna, Luna: Creative Writing Ideas from Spanish and Latino Literature. Ed. Julio Marzan.  New York: Teachers and Writers Collaborative, 1997.

Awards
 2021 Philip K. Dick Award
 Individual Artist Fellowship from the National Endowment for the Arts (NEA)
 Wallace Stegner Fellowship from Stanford University.
 2008 Ruth Lilly Fellowship from the Poetry Foundation.

External links 
 Author's Website

References 

Living people
American poets
Gettysburg College faculty
People from Athens County, Ohio
Writers from Ohio
1978 births
Fordham University faculty
Grand Valley State University faculty
Denison University faculty
Ohio University faculty